Hrvoje Čale (born 4 March 1985) is a former Croatian international footballer.

Club career
Čale began his career at age nine in the youth ranks of Dinamo Zagreb. He made his break into the first team in 2003. However, he was mostly used as a substitute when starters were injured. After his loan to Inter Zaprešić in 2004–05, Čale became a starter for Dinamo, where he played until the end of the 2007–08 season.

In May 2008, Čale was transferred to Trabzonspor for a fee of €2.5 million. He signed a four-year contract. Before the move, Čale called Davor Vugrinec and asked him about his experience with the club. Vugrinec talked very positively about the club, which Čale said contributed to his decision. He became Trabzonspor's 68th foreigner, and the second Croatian, after Davor Vugrinec.

In his first season with Trabzonspor, Čale participated in 36 total matches and cemented his place as the starting left-back. Čale was the starting left-back for the Turkish Cup winning side in 2010, and also started in the 2010 Turkish Super Cup final against league champions Bursaspor. Čale received a yellow card in a three nil victory for the Black Sea-based Trabzonspor.

On 19 July 2011, Čale's contract with Trabzonspor was terminated by mutual consent.

Čale moved to German Bundesliga side VfL Wolfsburg but failed to become regular first team member. After almost two seasons of struggling, Čale finally left Wolfsburg in May 2013 and signed for Belgian club Waasland-Beveren.

After two seasons for Waasland-Beveren, he left Belgium and signed for Olimpija Ljubljana. He left Ljubljana after only one season in summer of 2016. On 15 February 2017, after being free agent for more than half season he signed with Inter Zaprešić for the rest of the season.

International career
Čale represented Croatia at youth level. He made his senior international debut in a friendly victory against Romania on 11 February 2009 and earned a total of 5 caps, scoring no goals. His final international was a May 2010 friendly away against Estonia.

Honours 
Dinamo Zagreb
Prva HNL (3): 2005–06, 2006–07, 2007–08
Croatian Cup (3): 2004, 2007, 2008
Croatian Super Cup (1): 2006

Trabzonspor
Turkish Cup (1): 2009–10
Turkish Super Cup (1): 2010

Olimpija
PrvaLiga (1): 2015–16

References

External links 
 
 
 
 
 
 
 Hrvoje Čale at PrvaLiga 

1985 births
Living people
Footballers from Zagreb
Association football fullbacks
Croatian footballers
Croatia youth international footballers
Croatia under-21 international footballers
Croatia international footballers
GNK Dinamo Zagreb players
NK Inter Zaprešić players
Trabzonspor footballers
VfL Wolfsburg players
S.K. Beveren players
NK Olimpija Ljubljana (2005) players
Croatian Football League players
Süper Lig players
Bundesliga players
Belgian Pro League players
Slovenian PrvaLiga players
Croatian expatriate footballers
Expatriate footballers in Belgium
Expatriate footballers in Germany
Expatriate footballers in Turkey
Expatriate footballers in Slovenia
Croatian expatriate sportspeople in Belgium
Croatian expatriate sportspeople in Germany
Croatian expatriate sportspeople in Turkey
Croatian expatriate sportspeople in Slovenia